Etlingera velutina is a monocotyledonous plant species first described by Henry Nicholas Ridley, and given its current name by Rosemary Margaret Smith. Etlingera velutina is a member of the genus Etlingera and the family Zingiberaceae .

The species is divided into the following varieties:

Etlingera var. longipedunculata
Etlingera var. velutina

References 

velutina
Taxa named by Rosemary Margaret Smith